Olympos is a science fiction novel by American writer Dan Simmons published in 2005; it is the sequel to Ilium and final part of the Ilium/Olympos series. Like its predecessor it contains many literary references: it blends together Homer's epics the Iliad and the Odyssey, Shakespeare's The Tempest, and has frequent smaller references to other works, including Proust, James Joyce, Caliban upon Setebos, Shelley's Prometheus Unbound, Shakespearean poetry and even William Blake and Virgil's Aeneid.

Plot introduction
The novel centers on three main character groups; that of the scholic Hockenberry, Helen and Greek and Trojan warriors from the Iliad; Daeman, Harman, Ada and the other humans of Earth; and the moravecs, specifically Mahnmut the Europan and Orphu of Io. The novel is written in present-tense when centered on Hockenberry's character, but features third-person, past-tense narrative in all other instances. Much like Simmons' Hyperion where the actual events serve as a frame, the three groups of characters' stories are told over the course of the novel and their stories do not begin to converge until the end.

References to the real world
The "Paris Crater" location (a devastated French capital) includes a few references to the real world, supposedly produced by folk etymology such as "Invalid Hotel" for "Hôtel des Invalides", "Champs Ulysses" for "Champs-Élysées" or "Guarded Lion" for "Gare de Lyon".  A single reference in passing is made to the mountain "Pikespik" (for "Pikes Peak").

References

External links
 Olympos on Worlds Without End

2005 American novels
American science fiction novels
Sequel novels
Novels by Dan Simmons
Science fantasy novels
Novels set on Mars
Classical mythology in popular culture
HarperCollins books
Novels based on the Odyssey
2005 science fiction novels
Novels based on the Iliad
Novels based on The Tempest
Modern adaptations of the Odyssey
Modern adaptations of works by William Shakespeare
Modern adaptations of the Iliad